DeKalb is an unincorporated community in Vernon Township, Crawford County, Ohio, United States.

History
DeKalb was platted in 1835. A post office called DeKalb was established in 1833, and remained in operation until 1882.

References

Populated places in Crawford County, Ohio